Eunidia fasciata is a species of beetle in the family Cerambycidae. It was described by Charles Joseph Gahan in 1904.

References

Eunidiini
Beetles described in 1904
Taxa named by Charles Joseph Gahan